Tim Goodbody (born 1983) is an Irish sailor. He competed at the 2008 Summer Olympics in Beijing, where he placed 21st in the Finn class.

References

External links

1983 births
Living people
Irish male sailors (sport)
Olympic sailors of Ireland
Sailors at the 2008 Summer Olympics – Finn